The 1976 Segunda División de Chile was the 25th season of the Segunda División de Chile.

Ñublense was the tournament's champion.

First stage

Group North

Group South

Promotion Playoffs

Relegation playoffs

Primera División de Chile Relegation Playoffs
The teams qualified to the 1976 Primera División de Chile Relegation Playoffs were the teams placed in Championship Playoff's 3rd and 4th place respectively (Trasandino and Audax Italiano) and the teams placed in 1976 Primera División's 15th and 16th position (Huachipato y Rangers).

See also
Chilean football league system

References

External links
 RSSSF 1976

Segunda División de Chile (1952–1995) seasons
Primera B
Chil